This is a list of the 12 members of the European Parliament for Ireland elected at the 2009 European Parliament election. They served in the 2009 to 2014 session.

List

†Replaced during term, see table below for details.

Changes

See also
Members of the European Parliament 2009–2014 – List by country
List of members of the European Parliament, 2009–2014 – Full alphabetical list

External links
ElectionsIreland.org – 2009 European Parliament (Ireland) election results

2009
European Parliament
 List
Ireland